The following is a list of the television networks and announcers who have broadcast college football's Las Vegas Bowl throughout the years.

Television

Radio

References

Other sources

Further reading
 

Las Vegas
Broadcasters
Las Vegas Bowl
Las Vegas Bowl